Unlisted Trading Privileges (UTP) is Nasdaq's security Information process for trading securities that do not meet the requirements for listing on an exchange.

Acquisition and distribution of market data

Nasdaq established the UTP Plan to outline the consolidation and distribution of data through one centralized resource called the Securities Information Processor (SIP).

The securities listed on Nasdaq can be quoted and traded from any US exchange. Trades and quotes on these securities are distributed on two separate feeds, the UTP Quotation Data Feed (UQDF) and the UTP Trade Data Feed (UTDF).

UQDF provides traders a direct view of an NBBO. These feeds are considered level 1 or the top-of-book.

National Market System (NMS) plan
 
The NMS Plan regulates the UTP and Consolidated Tape Association (CTA) networks. The particulars for executing the regulation requires real-time reporting of transactions and their volumes, prices, and auditing details.

UTP and CTA
 
Not all quote or transaction data are available from a single provider. The quotes and trades of Cboe and NYSE listed securities are consolidated in line with the Consolidated Tape Association (CTA). The Consolidated Tape Association distributes trades and quotes across the Consolidated Tape System (CTS) and the Consolidated Quote System (CQS) feeds. The CTA and CQS are listed across two tapes – A and B. UTP is tape C.

Market data fees for the UTP (Tape C) network
 
 Co-location/Direct Access: $2,500
 Feed or Internet/Indirect Access: $500
 Non-display: $3,500
 Redistribution: $1,000
 Display (per 20 devices): $480

Participants
The current participants of the UTP Plan include:
 Cboe BYX Exchange
 Cboe BZX Exchange
 Cboe EDGA Exchange
 Cboe EDGX Exchange
 Cboe Exchange
 Financial Industry Regulatory Authority (FINRA)
 Investors' Exchange (IEX)
 Long-Term Stock Exchange (LTSE)
 Members Exchange (MEMX)
 MIAX Pearl (MIAX)
 Nasdaq BX
 Nasdaq PHLX 
 Nasdaq Stock Market 
 Nasdaq ISE
 New York Stock Exchange
 NYSE Arca
 NYSE American
 NYSE National
 NYSE Chicago

See also
 Consolidated Tape Association
 Market data
 Financial data vendors

References

Nasdaq